Kaisyuan is a station on the Red line of Kaohsiung MRT in Cianjhen District, Kaohsiung, Taiwan.

The station is a two-level, underground station with an island platform and three exits. It is 182 metres long and is located at the intersection of Jhongshan 3rd Rd and Kaisyuan 4th Rd.

Around the station
 Circular light rail Cianjhen Star light rail station
 Blue Lagoon Water Park
 Treasure Island Shopping Center
 Kaohsiung World Trade Plaza
 Dream Mall
 Jin-Zuan Night Market
 Kaisyuan Night Market

References

2008 establishments in Taiwan
Kaohsiung Metro Red line stations
Railway stations opened in 2008
Articles containing video clips